Robert Wynn may refer to:

Robert Wynn (MP) (died 1598), MP for Caernarfon, 1588
Robert Wynn (soldier) (1921–2000), U.S. Army soldier
Robert C. Wynn Baseball Field, Bradenton, Florida
Michael Wynn, 7th Baron Newborough (Robert Charles Michael Vaughan Wynn, 1917–1998), British peer

See also
Robert Wynne (disambiguation)